Wendy Delorme (born 28 July 1979) is a writer, performance artist, actress, and LGBT activist.

As a writer, Delorme published 4 novels in French, "Quatrième Génération" (Grasset, 2007), "Insurrections! en territoire sexuel" (Ed. Au Diable Vauvert 2009), "La Mère, la sainte et la putain" (ed. Au Diable Vauvert, 2012), and "Le Corps est une chimère" (Ed. au Diable Vauvert, 2018)
 
As a performance artist, she goes by the stage names Wendy Babybitch and Klaus Engel, as part of the neo-burlesque theater groups The Kisses Cause Trouble, The Drag King Fem Show, the Cabaret des Filles de Joie and the Queer X Show.

Going under the rubrique of performeuse in her one-woman shows near the racy Pigalle section of Paris, Delorme performs a hyper-exaggerated form of "femininity" as a male drag performer might, which harkens back to theoretical constructs such as "doing gender" or "gender performance" of Judith Butler.

About her performances, Delorme said, "In the morning or in the evening, in my bathroom, I reinvent myself, I become a woman, and that is not biological, it is more a question of belief.

Works 
 "Quatrième génération", (Fourth Generation) Grasset, novel, 2007.
 "Insurrections ! En territoire sexuel",  (Insurrections!  In Sexual Territory) Au Diable Vauvert, essay, 2009.
 (dir.) "In-soumises : contes cruels au féminin", avec Gala Fur, (Unsubmissive: Cruel Stories,  a la feminine) La Musardine, 2012.
 "La Mère, la sainte et la putain", (Mothers, Saints, and Whores), Au Diable Vauvert, novel, 2012.
 "Le Corps est une chimère", Au Diable Vauvert, novel, 2018.
 "Viendra le temps du feu", Cambourakis, novel, 2021.

Translations 
 Le Petit guide de la sexualité épanouie (The Good Vibrations Guide to Sex: The Most Complete Sex Manual Ever Written) de Cathy Winks et Anne Semans, trans. with Sandrine Bodet, éditions Tabou, 2009.
 Déséquilibres synthétiques (Will Work for Drugs) by Lydia Lunch, trans. with Virginie Despentes, Au Diable Vauvert, 2010.

Filmography 
 The final girl, experimental fiction, by Todd Verow, 2010.
 , documentary by her and Émilie Jouvet, 2010.
  [The Sex Workers], 2009. documentary about her
  2012. documentary about her
  [Tonight (or Never!)] 2007. documentary about her

See also
 Sex-positive feminism
 Queer theory
 Performance art
 Feminist pornography

Notes and references

External links
 
 

French women writers
French LGBT rights activists
21st-century pseudonymous writers
Pseudonymous women writers
French performance artists
English–French translators
French translators
1979 births
Living people
Sex-positive feminists
20th-century French women
21st-century French women